Henning Kristiansen (2 July 1927 – 2 November 2006) was a Danish cinematographer and film director. He was nominated for a BAFTA award for Best Cinematography for Babette's Feast.

Selected filmography
 Styrmand Karlsen (1958)
 Hunger (1966)
 The Dance of Death (1967)
 People Meet and Sweet Music Fills the Heart (1967)
 Jazz All Around (1969)
 The Night Visitor (1971)
 Ghost Train International (1976)
 Me and Charly (1978)
 Babette's Feast (1987)

References

External links

1927 births
2006 deaths
Danish cinematographers
Film directors from Copenhagen
Bodil Honorary Award recipients